Adam Bromley is a television and radio producer and director.

Specialising in comedy, Bromley has won two Sony Awards for radio. He won Silver Sony Award in 2002 for Think the Unthinkable, a management consultant sitcom written by James Cary. In 2004, he won a Bronze Sony Award for The Now Show, topical comedy show for BBC Radio 4. Bromley's other radio credits include Crème de la Crime, Concrete Cow, The Party Line, The Problem with Adam Bloom, Mitch Benn's Crimes Against Music, Recorded for Training Purposes, Hut 33, Double Science, Clive Anderson's Chat Room and Newfangle.

He produced two scripted comedy shows for CBBC, a live action puppet game show called Tiny and Mr Duk's Huge Show and a sketch show, starring Marcus Brigstocke, called Stupid!, written by Dean Wilkinson and a sitcom pilot, called Bash written by Robin French and Kieron Quirke. It aired on BBC Three in 2007. He produced and directed an E4 sitcom pilot called 'Jesusboy and the Goatherd', starring Jack Whitehall.

He has also directed music videos for Mitch Benn, including "Everything Sounds Like Coldplay Now" and "Happy Birthday War".

Bromley has written and directed a feature film called Buried Alive. The cast includes Hugh Dennis, Olivia Colman, Sally Hawkins and Mitch Benn. The film won the Best Feature award 2005 in the Digital Narrative Arts Festival, Canada.

References

External links
 
 
 

British television producers
British radio producers
Living people
Year of birth missing (living people)